The Free Software Initiative of Japan are a non-profit organization dedicated to supporting Free Software growth and development. It was founded on 10 July 2002 and organized the Free Software Symposium in Tokyo on October 22 and 23 of that year. The organization's founding chairman was Prof. Masayuki Ida, and  the current chairman is Niibe Yutaka. , FSIJ have been involved in the Google Summer of Code as a mentoring organization, CodeFest Kyoto and CodeFest Japan.

References

External links

 Free Software Initiative of Japan home page (English version)

Free and open-source software organizations